St Anne's Court is an alleyway that connects Dean Street and Wardour Street in London's Soho district. Parts of it can be dated back to the late 17th century. 

Sites in St Anne's Court included the "model lodgings" designed by William Burges in 1864-66 for the banker and philanthropist Lackland Mackintosh Rate, for whom Burges subsequently work at Milton Court, Dorking, Surrey.   At St Anne's, Rate wanted a commercial rental property.  The result was a series of thirty lodging rooms to be let to artisans.  The building was of brick with cast-iron piers.  Crook describes the result as "Burges's favourite 13th-century French, pared to the bone."  The building has subsequently been demolished.    

Sites also include the former Trident Studios and the 1970s science fiction bookshop Dark They Were, and Golden-Eyed. In the 1980s, a basement in St Anne's Court was home to Shades Records, a store specialising in extreme forms of Heavy Metal such as "Death Metal" and "Thrash Metal". As the only such store in the country, it played a particularly important role in the growth of those music genres in the UK.

See also 
 Meard Street, a nearby pedestrianized street parallel to St Anne's Court, of similar antiquity

Notes

References

External links 
 Posts on the subject of St Anne's Court

Streets in the City of Westminster
Streets in Soho
Odonyms referring to religion